Zarechny, called Penza-19 in 1962–1992, is a closed town in Penza Oblast, Russia, located  east of Penza. Population:

History
It was formed in 1958, on the territory of Penza's Zarechny City District. It was closed and named Penza-19 in 1962 and renamed Zarechny in 1992.

Administrative and municipal status
Within the framework of administrative divisions, it is incorporated as the town of oblast significance of Zarechny—an administrative unit with the status equal to that of the districts. As a municipal division, the town of oblast significance of Zarechny is incorporated as Zarechny Urban Okrug.

Economy
Zarechny's main employer is Rosatom and a major industry is manufacture of nuclear weapon components. Other industries include electronics and software.

Notable people
Maria Titova, rhythmic gymnast

References

Notes

Sources

Cities and towns in Penza Oblast
Closed cities
Populated places established in 1958
Naukograds